The 2019 Yobe State gubernatorial election occurred on March 9, 2019, the APC nominee Mai Mala Buni won the election, defeating Umar Iliya Damagum of the PDP.

Mai Mala Buni emerged APC gubernatorial candidate after scoring 2,797 votes and defeating his closest rival, Sidi Karasuwa who received 23 votes. He picked Idi Barde Gubana as his running mate. Umar Iliya Damagum was the PDP candidate with Baba Abba Aji as his running mate. 13 candidates contested in the election.

Electoral system
The Governor of Yobe State is elected using the plurality voting system.

Primary election

APC primary
The APC primary election was held on September 30, 2018. Mai Mala Buni won the primary election polling 2,797 votes against 3 other candidates. His closest rival was Sidi Karasuwa, who came second with 23 votes, Umar Ali came third with 8 votes, while Aji Kolo had 4 votes.

Candidates
Party nominee: Mai Mala Buni
Running mate: Idi Barde Gubana
Sidi Karasuwa
Aji Kolo

PDP primary
The PDP primary election was held on September 30, 2018. Umar Iliya Damagum emerged as the consensus candidate after his closest rival was Umar Elgash Maina withdrew.

Candidates
Party nominee: Umar Iliya Damagum
Running mate: Baba Abba Aji
Umar Elgash Maina- Withdrew

Results
A total number of 13 candidates registered with the Independent National Electoral Commission to contest in the election.

The total number of registered voters in the state was 1,365,913, while 546,391 voters were accredited. Total number of votes cast was 560,492, while number of valid votes was 546,391. Rejected votes were 14,101.

By local government area
Here are the results of the election by local government area for the two major parties. The total valid votes of 546,391 represents the 13 political parties that participated in the election. Blue represents LGAs won by Mai Mala Buni. Green represents LGAs won by Umar Iliya Damagum.

References 

Gubernatorial election
Yobe State gubernatorial election
Yobe State gubernatorial election
Yobe State gubernatorial elections